Sky Islands is the second album by Jazz fusion group Caldera released in 1977 on Capitol Records. The album rose to No. 18 on the Cashbox Top 40 Jazz Albums chart.

Covers
The album's title track was covered by Dianne Reeves on her 1987 self titled album and Ramsey Lewis on his 1993 LP Sky Islands.

A version of "Ancient Source" resulted from the collaboration between Herb Alpert and Caldera keyboardist Eddie del Barrio and appeared on Alpert's 1988 release Under a Spanish Moon.

Track listing

Personnel
 Jorge Strunz — acoustic guitar, electric guitar, percussion
 Eduardo del Barrio — acoustic piano, electric piano, synthesizers, Moog, Roland, Oberheim Polyphonic
 Steve Tavaglione — flute, alto flute, soprano saxophone, alto saxophone, tenor saxophone
 Mike Azeredo — congas, percussion
 Carlos Vega — drums
 Dean Cortez — electric bass
 Hector Andrade — timbales, congas, percussion
 Ernesto Herrera - lyricist.

Guests
 Larry Dunn — synthesizer (solo on track 2)
 Roberto da Silva — percussion
 Dianne Reeves — vocals (tracks 1 and 2)
 Chester Thompson — drums (track 4 only)
 Ralph Humphrey — drums (track 1 only)
 Ralph Rickert  — flugelhorn (track 8 only)
 Ray Armando — percussion
 Steve Barrio, Jr. — percussion
 Paul Shure — violin
 Bonnie Douglas — violin
 Harry Bluestone — violin
 Marshall Sosson — violin
 Nathan Ross — violin
 Antol Kaminsky — violin
 Jack Pepper — violin
 Irma Neumann — violin
 Janet Lakatos — viola
 Louis Kievman — viola
 Fredrick Seykora — cello
 Selene Hurford  — cello
 Shusei Nagaoka - cover art

References

1977 albums
1993 albums
Albums with cover art by Shusei Nagaoka
Capitol Records albums
Caldera (band) albums
Jazz-funk albums
Reissue albums